Vichy Vandens Parkas (English: Vichy Water Park) is a water park located in Lithuania capital Vilnius, it is in Ozo g. 14C, Vilnius 08200 (Ozas). The theme of Vichy Aqua Park is hospitable and exotic, so called the last paradise in the world, Polynesian environment and mood. This covers all zones of the park from clockroom, cash desk, attractions, and pools to staffs clothing, music, food and drinks served in the park. Vichy Aqua Park can accept 1,5 thousand visitors at one time. It was opened on May 31, 2007.

Entertainment

For holidaymakers
 Dolphins sea
 Lava saunas
 Jacuzzi
 Canoe river
 Turkish Hammam“
 “Bora Bora” and "Lava" sauna complexes

For little ones
 Birthday room - Makamaka tree
 Game island

For those, who like adrenaline
 Yell of the Maori
 Moreja volcano
 Fidji tornado
 Tanga snake
 Pitkern's cave
 Ohana River
 Black pearl
 Moskito

Food
 "Aloha" restaurant
 Aloha bistro
 Bar "MIX"
 Bar "Švyturys"
 Outdoor bar „Vichy Classique“

References

External links

 Official Website

Buildings and structures in Vilnius
2007 establishments in Lithuania
Tourist attractions in Vilnius
Water parks in Lithuania